Sándor Kugler (11 August 1879 – 11 November 1964) was a Hungarian swimmer. He competed in the men's 100 metre backstroke event at the 1908 Summer Olympics.

References

External links
 

1879 births
1964 deaths
Hungarian male swimmers
Olympic swimmers of Hungary
Swimmers at the 1908 Summer Olympics
Swimmers from Budapest
Male backstroke swimmers
Sportspeople from the Austro-Hungarian Empire